This is a list of American comics creators. Although comics have different formats, this list covers creators of comic books, graphic novels and comic strips, along with early innovators. The list presents authors with the United States as their country of origin, although they may have published or now be resident in other countries. For other countries, see List of comic creators.

A
Jack Abel (1927–1996)
Jessica Abel (born 1969)
Forrest J. Ackerman (1916–2008) - Vampirella, editor and principal writer of the magazine Famous Monsters of Filmland
Art Adams (born 1963)
Neal Adams (1941–2022) - Deadman, Batman
Scott Adams (born 1957) - Dilbert
Charles Addams (1912–1988) - The Addams Family
Dan Adkins (1937–2013)
Gene Ahern (1895–1960) - Our Boarding House, Room and Board, The Squirrel Cage, The Nut Bros.
Vince Alascia (1914–1998) - Timely Comics and Charlton Comics
F. O. Alexander (1897–1993) - Hairbreadth Harry
Mike Allred (born 1969)
Bob Almond (born 1967)
Bill Amend (born 1962) - FoxTrot
Brent Anderson  (born 1955)
Carl Thomas Anderson (1865–1948) - Henry
Murphy Anderson (1926–2015)
Ross Andru (1927–1993) - continued Wonder Woman and The Amazing Spider-Man, co-creator of the Metal Men
Jim Aparo (1932–2005) - DC Comics artist best known for 1970s Batman
Sergio Aragonés (born 1937) - Mad Magazine, Groo the Wanderer
Everett M. "Busy" Arnold (1899–1974) - publisher Quality Comics
Gus Arriola (1917–2008) - Gordo
Ruth Atkinson (1918–1997) - Millie the Model, Patsy Walker
Terry Austin (born 1952)
Al Avison (1920–1984) - continued Captain America
Brian Azzarello (born 1962)

B
Derf Backderf (born 1959) - My Friend Dahmer
Mark Bagley (born 1957)
George Baker (1915–1975) - Sad Sack
Carl Barks (1901–2000) - Donald Duck, Scrooge McDuck
Donna Barr (born 1952) - Stinz, The Desert Peach
Lynda Barry (born 1956) - Ernie Pook's Comeek
Richard Bassford (born 1936)
Tom Batiuk (born 1947) - Funky Winkerbean, John Darling
Alison Bechdel (born 1960) - Dykes to Watch Out For
C. C. Beck (1910–1989) - Captain Marvel
Gabrielle Bell (born 1976)
Howard Bender (born 1951)
Brian Michael Bendis (born 1967)
Christian Beranek (born 1974)
Dave Berg (1920–2002) - The Lighter Side of...
Karen Berger (born 1958) - Vertigo
Walter Berndt (1899–1979) - Smitty
D. Bruce Berry (1924–1998)
Jim Berry (1932–2015) - Berry's World
Nick Bertozzi (born 1970)
Gordon Bess (1929–1989) - Redeye
Charles Biro (1911–1972) - Steel Sterling, best known for work with publisher Lev Gleason Comic House
Wally Bishop (1905–1982) - Muggs and Skeeter
Stephen R. Bissette (born 1955)
Bud Blake (1918–2005) - Tiger
Merrill Blosser (1892–1983) - Freckles and His Friends
Vaughn Bodé (1941–1975) - Cheech Wizard
Wayne Boring (1905–1987) - continued Superman
Brett Booth (born 1972)
Troy Boyle (born 1966)
Martin Branner (1888–1970) - Winnie Winkle, Perry and the Rinky-Dinks
Berkeley Breathed (born 1957) - Bloom County, Outland, Opus
T. Casey Brennan (born 1948)
Norm Breyfogle (1960–2018)
Clare Briggs (1875–1930) - A. Piker Clerk
Jeffrey Brown (born 1975) - Clumsy, Unlikely, Incredible Change-Bots
Dik Browne (1917–1989) - Hi & Lois, Hägar the Horrible
Frank Brunner (born 1949)
Bob Burden (born 1952) - Flaming Carrot
Carl Burgos (1916–1984) - Human Torch
Cary Burkett (born 1952)
Mildred Burleigh (1887–?)
Charles Burns (born 1955) - El Borbah, Black Hole
John Buscema (1927–2002) - Marvel Comics
Sal Buscema (born 1936)
Ernie Bushmiller (1905–1982) - Fritzi Ritz, Nancy
Kurt Busiek (born 1960)
John Byrne (born 1950)
Gene Byrnes (1889–1974) - Reg'lar Fellers

C
 Dick Calkins (August 12, 1894 – May 12, 1962) - (Buck Rogers)
 John Calnan
 Donald Clough Cameron
 Milton Caniff - (Terry and the Pirates, Steve Canyon, Male Call)
Sophie Campbell - (Wet Moon)
 Max Cannon -  (Red Meat)
 Al Capp -  (Li'l Abner)
 Greg Capullo - (Batman, Spawn)
Nick Cardy - (continued Aquaman and Teen Titans, co-creator of Bat Lash)
 Sergio Cariello
 Wallace Carlson - (The Nebbs)
 Vic Carrabotta
 Ad Carter - (Just Kids)
 Dick Cavalli - (Morty Meekle, Winthrop)
 Louis Cazeneuve - (continued Aquaman)
 Kody Chamberlain - (30 Days of Night, Digital Webbing)
 Jack T. Chick -  (Chick tracts)
 Frank Cho - (Liberty Meadows)
 Frank Cirocco
 Scott Clark - (Martian Manhunter back-up in the 2013 Justice League of America series)
 Daniel Clowes - (Eightball, Ghost World)
 Dave Cockrum - (co-creator of the "new X-Men")
 Gene Colan - (Daredevil)
 Jack Cole - (Plastic Man)
Vince Colletta - (inker noted for work on Jack Kirby's The Mighty Thor)
 A.D. Condo - (The Outbursts of Everett True; Mr. Skygack, from Mars)
 Darby Conley
 Gerry Conway
 Richard Corben - (Den)
 Denys Cowan
Johnny Craig - (EC Comics)
Reed Crandall
 Roy Crane -  (Captain Easy, Wash Tubbs)
 Robert Crumb - (Fritz the Cat, Mr. Natural, Keep on Truckin')
 Nick Cuti - (E-Man, Moonchild, Captain Cosmos, Moonie)

D
 Nicholas P. Dallis - (Rex Morgan, M.D., Judge Parker, Apartment 3-G)
Dame Darcy - (Meatcake)
 Geof Darrow - (Hard Boiled, Big Guy and Rusty the Boy Robot, Shaolin Cowboy)
 Nicholas Da Silva aka ZOOLOOK - (Dread & Alive and HITLESS)
 Peter David
 Jack Davis - (Mad Magazine)
 Jim Davis - (Garfield)
 Billy DeBeck - (Barney Google and Snuffy Smith)
Dan DeCarlo - (Archie Comics, Josie and the Pussycats)
 Graham Francis Defries - (co-creator of Queens Counsel)
 Kim Deitch - (Waldo the Cat)
 J. M. DeMatteis
 Vince Deporter
 Stephen DeStefano
 Tony DiGerolamo
Diane DiMassa - (Hothead Paisan)
Dick Dillin - (Justice League of America)
 Rudolph Dirks - (Katzenjammer Kids)
 Walt Disney -  (Disney comics)
 Steve Ditko - (Spider-Man, Doctor Strange, Creeper, Hawk and Dove)
 Richard Dominguez
 Colleen Doran
 Evan Dorkin
Arnold Drake - (Deadman, co-creator of The Guardians of the Galaxy and It Rhymes with Lust) 
 Stan Drake - (The Heart of Juliet Jones)
 Bill Draut
 Grace Drayton - (Dolly Dimples)
 Mike Dringenberg
 Mort Drucker -  (film and TV parodies in Mad Magazine)
 Randy DuBurke
 Clare Victor Dwiggins - (School Days)
Gaylord DuBois - (Brothers of the Spear, longtime writer for Tarzan, Roy Rogers, Turok, Space Family Robinson)
Edwina Dumm - (Cap Stubbs and Tippie, Alec the Great)
Clare Victor Dwiggins - (School Days)
Troy Dye - (Goblin Chronicles)

E
Kevin Eastman - (co-creator of Teenage Mutant Ninja Turtles)
Chondra Echert - (The Armory Wars)
Carl Ed - (Harold Teen)
Gus Edson - (The Gumps, Dondi)
 Hy Eisman - (continued Little Lulu, Popeye and The Katzenjammer Kids) 
 Will Eisner - (The Spirit, A Contract with God)
 Will Elder - (Mad Magazine, Panic, co-creator of Goodman Beaver and Little Annie Fanny)
 Harlan Ellison
 Randy Emberlin
 Steve Englehart
Rod Espinoza - (Neotopia, The Courageous Princess)
 Mark Evanier
George Evans 
Bill Everett - (Namor the Sub-Mariner)

F
 Al Fagaly - (Super Duck, There Oughta Be a Law)
 Kevin Fagan - (Drabble)
 Lee Falk - (The Phantom, Mandrake the Magician)
 Chandra Free
 Jules Feiffer - (Feiffer)
 Lyonel Feininger - (The Kin-der-Kids, Wee Willie Winkie's World)
 Al Feldstein - (EC Comics, Mad Magazine)
 Lou Fine - (co-creator of Black Condor)
 Charles Fincher - (The Illustrated Daily Scribble, Thadeus & Weez)
 Bill Finger - (Batman)
 Andy Fish - (Adam Bomb)
 Bud Fisher -  (Mutt and Jeff)
 Dudley Fisher - (Right Around Home)
 Hart D. Fisher - (Jeffrey Dahmer: An Unauthorized Biography of a Serial Killer, publisher of Boneyard Press)
 Seth Fisher - (artist best known for his work at Vertigo and Marvel Comics)
 James Montgomery Flagg - (Nervy Nat)
 Anthony Flamini
 Mary Fleener
 Shary Flenniken - (Trots and Bonnie)
 John Forte
 Brad W. Foster - (Mechthings, co-creator of The Adventures of Olivia)
 Fontaine Fox - (Toonerville Folks)
 Gardner Fox - (longtime writer for Justice Society of America, Justice League of America)
 Matt Fraction - (The Invincible Iron Man, Sex Criminals)
 Frank Frazetta
 Chandra Free
 Ron Frenz
 Gary Friedrich
 Mike Friedrich
 Ralph Fuller

G
 David Gallaher - (Yours Truly, Johnny Dollar)
 Herb Gardner - (The Nebbishes)
 George Gately - (Heathcliff)
 Steve Gerber - (Howard the Duck)
 Frank Giacoia - (worked on Captain America)
 Joe Giella
 Keith Giffen
 Peter B. Gillis
 Phoebe Gloeckner - (A Child's Life and Other Stories,  The Diary of a Teenage Girl: An Account in Words and Pictures)
 Rube Goldberg - (Boob McNutt, Mike and Ike (They Look Alike))
 Stan Goldberg
 Michael Golden
 Archie Goodwin
 Floyd Gottfredson - (Mickey Mouse)
 Chester Gould - (Dick Tracy)
 Billy Graham
 Brandon Graham  - (Prophet)
 Sam Grainger
 Vernon Grant - (The Love Rangers)
 Harold Gray - (Little Orphan Annie)
 Grass Green - (Xal-Kor the Human Cat)
 Justin Green - (Binky Brown)
 Vernon Greene - (The Shadow, continued Bringing Up Father)
 Roberta Gregory - (Naughty Bits)
 Mike Grell
 Rick Griffin - (Flying Eyeball)
 Bill Griffith - (Zippy)
 Matt Groening - (Life in Hell)
 Milt Gross - (He Done Her Wrong, Count Screwloose)
 Dick Guindon - (The Carp Chronicles, Guindon)
 Cathy Guisewite - (Cathy)
 Paul Gustavson - (The Angel)

H
 Harry Haenigsen - (Penny)
 Jessica Hagy - (Indexed)
 Larry Hama - (G.I. Joe)
 V. T. Hamlin - (Alley Oop)
 Cully Hamner
 Stuart Hample - (Inside Woody Allen)
 Marc Hansen
 Kevin Konrad Hanna - (creator of Clockwork Girl)
 Fred Harman - (Red Ryder)
 Jack C. Harris
 Tony Harris
 Sol Harrison
 Dean Haspiel
 Johnny Hart - (B.C., The Wizard of Id)
 Al Hartley
 Jimmy Hatlo - (They'll Do It Every Time, Little Iodine)
 Ethel Hays - (Flapper Fanny Says)
 Don Heck - (co-creator of Iron Man, Black Widow)
 Gilbert "Beto" Hernandez - (co-creator of Love and Rockets)
 Jaime Hernandez - (co-creator of Love and Rockets)
 Javier Hernandez - (creator of El Muerto)
 Mario Hernandez - (co-creator of Love and Rockets)
 George Herriman - (Krazy Kat)
 Harry Hershfield - (Abie the Agent)
 Sol Hess - (writer of The Nebbs)
Don Hillsman II
 Walter Hoban - (Jerry on the Job)
 Rick Hoberg
 Burne Hogarth - (Tarzan The All Story)
 Nicole Hollander - (Sylvia)
 Bill Holman - (Smokey Stover)
 F. M. Howarth - (The Love of Lulu and Leander, Ole Opey Dildock)
 Richard Howell
 Kin Hubbard - (Abe Martin of Brown County)
 Reginald Hudlin
 James D. Hudnall

I
 Jerry Iger - (Sheena, Queen of the Jungle)
 Jamal Igle
 Carmine Infantino - (DC Comics artist, later executive)
 Graham Ingels
 Tony Isabella

J
 Al Jaffee - (Mad Fold-in, Snappy Answers to Stupid Questions)
 Jimmy Janes
 Avy Jetter
 Geoff Johns
 Crockett Johnson - (Barnaby)
 Jimmy Johnson - (Arlo and Janis)
 Lynn Johnston - (For Better or For Worse)
 Arvell Jones
 Bruce Jones
 Chuck Jones - (Crawford)
 Kelley Jones
 Russ Jones
 Tom Joyner
 Dan Jurgens
 Justiniano

K
 C. W. Kahles - (Haidbreadth Harry, Clarence the Cop)
 Michael Kaluta
 Jack Kamen
 Bob Kane - (Batman)
 Gil Kane - (continued Green Lantern, The Atom, The Amazing Spider-Man)
 George Kapitan - Green Giant, Black Widow, Archie, Human Torch, Air Man, Namor The Submariner)
 Bob Karp - (wrote Donald Duck comics)
 Kaz - (Kaz's Underworld)
 Bil Keane - (The Family Circus)
Jack Keller - (Kid Colt)
 Walt Kelly - (Pogo)
 Jack Kent - (King Aroo)
 Barbara Kesel
 Karl Kesel
 Hank Ketcham - (Dennis the Menace)
 Sam Kieth
 Frank King - (Gasoline Alley)
 Jack Kirby - (Captain America, Spider-Man, The Incredible Hulk, Fantastic Four, X-Men, Sgt. Fury and his Howling Commandos, Iron Man, New Gods, Fourth World)
Robert Kirby - (Curbside)
 Robert Kirkman - (The Walking Dead, Invincible)
George Klein - (Silver Age inker)
 Todd Klein
 James Kochalka - (American Elf)
 Scott Kolins
 Aline Kominsky-Crumb - (Dirty Laundry Comix)
 Harold Knerr - (continued The Katzenjammer Kids)
 Wilhelm Heinrich Detlev Körner - (Hugo Hercules)
 Bernard Krigstein - (E.C. Comics, Master Race)
 Teddy Kristiansen
 Joe Kubert
 Charles Kuhn - (Grandma)
 Harvey Kurtzman - (Mad Magazine, Little Annie Fanny)
Sam Kweskin

L
Peter Laird - (co-creator of Teenage Mutant Ninja Turtles)
 Erik Larsen
 Rick Law
David Lawrence
 Bob Layton
 Leon Lazarus
 Mell Lazarus - (Momma)
Mort Leav
 Jae Lee
 Jim Lee
 Stan Lee - (writer of Spider-Man, The Incredible Hulk, X-Men, The Silver Surfer, The Fantastic Four)
Bob LeRose
Lank Leonard - (Mickey Finn)
Harris Levey, aka Lee Harris - DC Comics illustrator, creator of Air Wave
 Paul Levitz
 George Lichty - (Grin and Bear It)
 Larry Lieber - (co-creator of Iron Man, Ant-Man, and Thor)
 Rob Liefeld - (Deadpool)
 Mike Lilly
 Marty Links - (Emmy Lou)
 Jason Little
Vic Lockman - (worked on Disney comics, made Christian comics)
Bobby London - (Dirty Duck, continued Popeye)
 Frank Lovece
 David Lynch - (The Angriest Dog in the World)
 Jay Lynch - (Nard 'n' Pat, Bijou Funnies)
 Stan Lynde - (Rick O'Shay, Latigo)

M
 David W. Mack
 Ed Mack - (Sime the Simp, continued Mutt & Jeff)
 Jeff MacNelly - (Shoe)
 Matt Madden
 Gus Mager - (Hawkshaw the Detective, Sherlocko the Monk)
 Elliot S. Maggin
 Joe Maneely - (The Black Knight, Yellow Claw, The Ringo Kid)
 Russ Manning - (continued Tarzan)
 Bill Mantlo - (Rocket Raccoon, Cloak and Dagger)
 Pablo Marcos
 Jerry Marcus - (Trudy)
 Marge - (Little Lulu)
 Jesse Marsh - (continued Tarzan and John Carter of Mars)
 William Moulton Marston - (Wonder Woman)
 Don Martin - (Mad Magazine, Captain Klutz, Fonebone)
 Edgar Martin - (Boots and Her Buddies)
 Harry B. Martin - (Weatherbird)
 S. Carlisle Martin - (Weatherbird)
 Mark Martin
 Cal Massey - (worked for Timely/Atlas Comics, St. John's Publishing)
 Fran Matera - (continued Steve Roper and Mike Nomad)
 Joe Matt - (Peepshow)
 Paul Mavrides - (assisted on The Fabulous Furry Freak Brothers)
 Sheldon Mayer - (Sugar & Spike)
 Val Mayerik - (Howard the Duck)
 Clifford McBride - (Napoleon and Uncle Elby)
 Winsor McCay - (Little Nemo in Slumberland, Little Sammy Sneeze)
 Scott McCloud - (Zot!, Understanding Comics)
 Luke McDonnell
 Patrick McDonnell - (Mutts)
 Walt McDougall - (Queer Visitors from the Marvelous Land of Oz)
 J.P. McEvoy - (Dixie Dugan)
 Don McGregor
 Aaron McGruder - (The Boondocks)
 Roger Mckenzie
 Bob McLeod
 George McManus - (Bringing Up Father)
 Shawn McManus
 Carla Speed McNeil - (Finder)
 Nick Meglin - (Mad Magazine)
 Jack Mendelsohn - (Jacky's Diary)
 Mort Meskin
 Otto Messmer - (Felix the Cat)
 Bill Messner-Loebs - (Journey: The Adventures of Wolverine MacAlistaire)
 Pop Mhan - (Blank, co-creator of Spyboy)
 David Michelinie
 Mike Mignola - (Rocket Raccoon, Hellboy)
 Al Milgrom
 Frank Miller - (The Dark Knight Returns, Sin City, 300)
 Frank Miller - (Barney Baxter in the Air)
 Wiley Miller
 Tony Millionaire - (Sock Monkey, Maakies)
 Tarpe Mills - (Miss Fury)
 Takeshi Miyazawa
 Christopher Moeller
 Sheldon Moldoff
 Arthur R. "Pop" Momand - (Keeping Up with the Joneses)
 Bob Montana - (Archie Comics)
 Jim Mooney - (Supergirl)
 Richard Moore - (Far West, Boneyard)
 Terry Moore
 Dick Moores - (continued Gasoline Alley)
 Rags Morales
 Pete Morisi
 Gray Morrow - (Man-Thing, El Diablo)
 Zack Mosley - (The Adventures of Smilin' Jack)
 Dean Motter
 John Cullen Murphy - (Big Ben Bolt, continued Prince Valiant)
 Paul Murry - (worked on Disney comics)
 Joe Musial - (continued The Katzenjammer Kids and Popeye)
Russell Myers - (Broom-Hilda)

N
 Fred Neher - (Life's Like That)
 Michael Netzer
 Josh Neufeld - (A.D.: New Orleans After the Deluge, worked on American Splendor)
 Diane Noomin - (Glitz-2-Go, editor of Twisted Sisters)
 Irv Novick

O
 Rik Offenberger - (G-Man Comics)
 Mike Okamoto
 Bob Oksner - (various celebrity comics)
Steve Oliff (born 1954)
 Dan O'Neill - (Air Pirates)
 Dennis O'Neil
Rose O'Neill - (1909)
Chris Onstad - (Achewood)
 Frederick Burr Opper - (Happy Hooligan, Alphonse and Gaston, And Her Name Was Maud)
 Jerry Ordway
 Joe Orlando - (worked for Mad Magazine, Creepy)
 John Ostrander
 Richard F. Outcault - (The Yellow Kid, Buster Brown)
Bruce Ozella - (continued Popeye)

P
 Tom Palmer
 Jimmy Palmiotti
 Brant Parker - (co-creator of The Wizard of Id)
 Virgil Partch - (Big George, The Captain's Gig)
 Stephan Pastis - Pearls Before Swine
 Chuck Patton
 C. M. Payne - (Scary William, Honeybunch's Hubby, S'Matter, Pop?, Coon Hollow Folks, Bear Creek Folks)
 Bill Pearson - (witzend, wrote and continued Popeye)
 Harvey Pekar - (American Splendor)
 George Pérez
 Don Perlin
Bill Perry - (continued Gasoline Alley)
Fred Perry - (Gold Digger, Legacy)
 Harry G. Peter - (Wonder Woman)
 Rina Piccolo - (Tina's Groove)
 Wendy Pini - (Elfquest)
 Mike Ploog
 Keith Pollard
 Whilce Portacio
 Al Posen - (Them Days Are Gone Forever, Sweeney & Son)
 Howard Post - (The Dropouts)
 Greg Potter
 Carl Potts
 Brian Pulido
Howard Purcell
 Steve Purcell

Q
 Joe Quesada - (2000s editor-in-chief of Marvel Comics)

R
 Janice Race
 Ted Rall - (political-satirical comics)
 Albertine Randall - (The Dumbunnies)
 Ron Randall
Grace Randolph - (Grace Randolph's Supurbia)
 Alex Raymond - (Flash Gordon, Rip Kirby, Secret Agent X-9, Jungle Jim)
Paul Reinman - (inker for Jack Kirby)
David Rees
 Ralph Reese
 Robert L. Ripley - (Ripley's Believe It or Not!)
Alex Robinson
Jerry Robinson
Frank Robbins - (Johnny Hazard, continued Scorchy Smith)
Trina Robbins - (Wimmen's Comix)
 Spain Rodriguez - (Trashman)
Marshall Rogers
 Don Rosa - (Donald Duck, Uncle Scrooge)
 Alex Ross
Arnold Roth - (Poor Arnold's Almanac)
George Roussos, aka George Bell - (Marvel Comics inker best known for early issues of Jack Kirby's The Fantastic Four)
 Greg Rucka
Christopher Rule
 Bruce Russell - (Rollo Rollingstone)
 Clarence D. Russell - (Pete the Tramp)
 P. Craig Russell
Paul Ryan

S
 Bud Sagendorf - (continued Popeye)
 Harry Sahle (Black Widow, Green Giant, Fiery Mask, Human Torch, Archie, Candy)
 Stan Sakai
Richard Sala - (Peculia)
Claudio Sanchez - (writer of The Armory Wars)
Darren Sanchez
Jim Sasseville - (worked on Peanuts, continued It's Only a Game)
Allen Saunders
 Jim Scancarelli - (continued Gasoline Alley)
 Jack Schiff
 Alex Schomburg
Ariel Schrag - (Adam: A Novel, Likewise, Potential)
Mark Schultz (born 1955) - Xenozoic Tales
 Carl E. Schultze - (Foxy Grandpa)
 Charles M. Schulz - (Peanuts, Li'l Folks, It's Only a Game)
 David Schwartz
Julius Schwartz - (editor for DC Comics often credited with launching the Silver Age of Comic Books)
Ethan Van Sciver (born 1974)
 Dori Seda
 Elzie Segar - (Thimble Theatre, Popeye)
 Tim Seeley - (HACK/slash, Loaded Bible, Lovebunny & Mr. Hell)
 Mike Sekowsky
 John Severin - (Mad Magazine, Cracked, Frontline Combat, Two-Fisted Tales, Sgt. Fury and his Howling Commandos, Two-Gun Kid)
 Marie Severin - (EC Comics, Marvel Comics)
Eric Shanower (born 1963)
 Gilbert Shelton - (The Fabulous Furry Freak Brothers)
 Jim Sherman
 Gary Shipman - (Pakkins' Land)
 Rhoda Shipman - (co-writer, Pakkins' Land)
 Syd Shores - (continued Captain America)
 Jim Shooter - (Marvel Comics editor-in-chief)
 Joe Shuster - (Superman)
 Noel Sickles - (Scorchy Smith)
 Bill Sienkiewicz
 Jerry Siegel - (Superman)
 Marc Silvestri
 Gail Simone
 Joe Simon
 Louise Simonson
 Walt Simonson
 Joe Sinnott
 Stephen Slesinger - (Red Ryder and King of the Royal Mounted)
 Roger Slifer
 Dan Slott
 Al Smith - (continued Mutt and Jeff)
 Jeff Smith - (Bone)
 Mark Andrew Smith
 Paul Smith
 Sidney Smith - (The Gumps)
 Mark Smylie - (Artesia)
 Art Spiegelman - (Maus, In the Shadow of No Towers)
 Dick Sprang - (co-creator of the Riddler and long time Batman artist)
 Leonard Starr - (Mary Perkins, On Stage, continued Little Orphan Annie)
 Jim Starlin
 Richard Dean Starr
 Joe Staton - (E-Man)
 Brian Stelfreeze
 Jim Steranko - (Nick Fury)
 Roger Stern
 Chic Stone - (Silver Age inker, best known for work with Jack Kirby)
 J. Michael Straczynski
 Jan Strnad
 Laurie S. Sutton
 Tom Sutton
 Curt Swan - (continued Superman)
 Jimmy Swinnerton - (The Little Bears, Mr. Jack, Little Jimmy)

T
 John Tartaglione
 Frank Tashlin - (Van Boring)
 Raina Telgemeier - (Smile, Sisters)
 Hilda Terry - (Teena)
 Bob Thaves - (Frank and Ernest)
 Roy Thomas
 Bart Thompson
 Craig Thompson
 Adrian Tomine - (Optic Nerve)
 Alex Toth
 John Totleben
 Herb Trimpe
 Corky Trinidad - (Nguyen Charlie)
 Garry Trudeau - (Doonesbury)
 Timothy Truman
 Warren Tufts - (Casey Ruggles, Lance)
 Rick Tulka - (Mad Magazine)
 Morrie Turner - (Wee Pals)
 George Tuska - (Hercule, Scorchy Smith)
 Carol Tyler - (Late Bloomer, You'll Never Know)

V
 Andrew Vachss
 Jim Valentino
 Raeburn Van Buren - (Abbie an' Slats)
 Jhonen Vasquez - (Johnny the Homicidal Maniac, Squee)
 Brian K. Vaughan
Rick Veitch (born 1951)
 Gustave Verbeek - (The Upside Downs of Little Lady Lovekins and Old Man Muffaroo)
 Charles Vess
 Charles Voight - (Betty)

W
 John Wagner
 Matt Wagner - (Mage, Grendel)
 Mark Waid
 Mort Walker - (Beetle Bailey, Hi & Lois (writer),  Boner's Ark)
 Reed Waller - ("Omaha" the Cat Dancer)
 Chris Ware - (The Acme Novelty Library, Jimmy Corrigan)
 Adam Warren
 Bill Watterson - (Calvin and Hobbes)
 Gerard Way
 H. T. Webster - (Caspar Milquetoast)
 Len Wein - (Swamp Thing, Wolverine, X-Men, Human Target, Justice League)
 Mort Weisinger - (Silver Age editor of Superman)
 Alan Weiss
 Morris Weiss
 Larry Welz - (Cherry)
 Russ Westover - (Tillie the Toiler)
 Ed Wheelan - (Minute Movies)
 Mack White
 Ogden Whitney - (Herbie Popnecker)
 George Wildman - (continued Popeye)
 Signe Wilkinson
 Frank Willard - (Moon Mullins)
 Al Williamson
 Skip Williamson - (Snappy Sammy Smoot)
 Bill Willingham
 Mary Wilshire
 Ron Wilson
 Doc Winner - (Tubby, continued Popeye, Katzenjammer Kids) 
 Al Wiseman - (continued Dennis the Menace)
 Elmer Woggon - (Steve Roper and Mike Nomad)
 Marv Wolfman
 Wally Wood - (EC Comics, Mad Magazine)
 Jim Woodring - (Frank)
 Joshua Workman - (co-creator of Blamo Comics; artist on Ferocity, The Mirage, The Unlimiteds, Lightning Bug, Rayman, Big-Man, X, Dusk, Blaze; writer for The Unlimiteds and X)
 Gregory Wright
 Bernie Wrightson - (Bernie Wrightson's Frankenstein, House of Mystery, House of Secrets, Swamp Thing)
 George Wunder - (continued Terry and the Pirates)

Y
 Gene Luen Yang
 Chic Young - (Blondie)
 Lyman Young - (Tim Tyler's Luck)
 Tommy Yune - (Buster the Amazing Bear, writer/artist of Speed Racer)

Z
 Bela Zaboly - (continued Popeye)
 Bob Zschiesche - (continued Gasoline Alley)

See also
List of newspaper comic strips

References 

American comics creators
 
Lists of American artists